Spitalfields Music (previously known as Spitalfields Festival, officially registered as Spitalfields Festival Ltd) is a music charity based in the Bethnal Green area of the London Borough of Tower Hamlets. Through musical events, the charity hopes to strengthen the local community Spitalfields Music is a registered charity with number 1052043.

The charity's work consists of producing music festivals and a community "Learning & Participation" programme. Several new works are commissioned each year for the festival.

History
1976 – Spitalfields Festival was created when a single event, organised by Save Britain's Heritage, was held at Christ Church in Spitalfields in the summer.
1977 – In the summer the first official festival occurred. It was run by Friends of Christ Church, which had been formed the previous year after the single event had been held.
1989 – The Festival Council was formed and more importantly so was the Education and Community Programme.
1996 – The decision was taken to expand the festival to incorporate a Winter Festival.
2003 – Christ Church was unavailable due to renovation works so the festival was spread around 13 venues.
2005 – Winner of the Royal Philharmonic Society Music Award for Education from Spitalfields Festival commission of Jonathan Dove's community cantata On Spital Fields.
2006 – Winner of the Royal Philharmonic Society Music Award for Concert Series or Festival.
2020 - The festival was postponed due to the coronavirus pandemic.

Learning and Participation Programme
Since the founding of the education programme in 1989, the work that Spitalfields Music does with the community of Tower Hamlets has grown considerably. It was an early pioneer in the field of arts festival education programmes in the UK. Spitalfields Music delivers a busy programme throughout the year, working in schools, special needs settings, care homes and community spaces.

Alongside its Learning and Participation Programme, Spitalfields Music also runs a number of schemes to develop artists and music leaders of the future, including Trainee Music Leaders Scheme and Open Call.

Trainee Music Leaders Scheme
This is a year-long training programme for emerging music leaders to develop their skills as creative music leaders in learning and community settings, working with national partners including: Welsh National Opera, LSO Discovery, Opera North, Orchestras Live, Multi Story Orchestra and Southbank Sinfonia.

Open Call
Open Call is an open commissioning project that nurtures artists from diverse backgrounds to develop their compositional practice, developing early stage pieces to a work-in-progress stage, and testing new ways to connect their work to audiences.

Funding
Spitalfields Music is a charity and relies on grants, sponsorships, in kind help and donations to help run its festivals and the Learning and Participation Programme. They receive financial support from trusts, foundations, corporate giving, public funding and individual giving. They also earn a small percentage of their income from ticket sales from their festivals.

References

External links
www.spitalfieldsmusic.org.uk Official Website

Music festivals established in 1976
Music festivals in London
Classical music festivals in England
Charities based in London
1976 establishments in England
Organisations based in the London Borough of Tower Hamlets
Spitalfields